Michael John Henry Harbison was the Lord Mayor of Adelaide, South Australia from 2003 to 2010. He was succeeded by Stephen Yarwood in 2010. He is also Adelaide's longest serving mayor.

Before becoming Lord Mayor, he was a successful businessman. In the 1980s, after their marriage, Harbison and his wife Kathy Harbison co-purchased Woodroofe, the soft drink factory in Norwood, along with the Hartley family.

Harbison became a Councillor in 1998.

In 2002, Harbison ran as Liberal candidate for the state seat of Adelaide and was defeated by Jane Lomax-Smith.

Harbison drove the semi-trailer for the University of Michigan Solar Car Team in the 2011 World Solar Challenge.

References

1953 births
Living people
Mayors and Lord Mayors of Adelaide
Deputy mayors of places in Australia